Henry Hoke may refer to:

 Henry Hoke (author), American author
 Henry Hoke (fictional inventor), a fictitious Australian scientist, engineer, and inventor